The men's 400 metres at the 2013 IPC Athletics World Championships was held at the Stade du Rhône from 20–29 July. There were 12 categories contested over the 400m at the championship. Two World records were set in the 400m, Chermen Kobesov of Russia posted a time of 51.88s in the T37 class,  while Ahmad Almutairi of Kuwait recorded a time of 57.95s in the T33 category. Almutairi's category was not part of the schedule of this championship, but he qualified to compete in the T34 category. Despite coming last in his qualifying round and not advancing to the final he still broke the T33 world record.

Medalists

CR - Championship record, WR - World record

See also
List of IPC world records in athletics

References

400 metres
400 metres at the World Para Athletics Championships